George Roseborough Collins (September 2, 1917 – January 5, 1993) was an American art historian and educator. An expert on the work of the architect Antoni Gaudí, Collins was Professor of Art History at Columbia University.

Career
A native of Springfield, Collins graduated from Newton High School in 1935. He received a Bachelor of Arts from Princeton University in 1939, and then continued on to earn a Master of Fine Arts in 1942. Four years later, Collins became Professor of Art History at Columbia University. In 1962, he was awarded a Guggenheim Fellowship. In 1986, Collins retired from teaching. He became an expert on the work of the architect Antoni Gaudí.

In 1989 and 1993, the papers of Collins were donated by his wife, Christiane Crasemann,  to the Art Institute of Chicago. He would die in that year in Falmouth after battling Alzheimer's disease.

See also
List of Columbia University people
List of Guggenheim Fellowships awarded in 1962
List of Princeton University people

References

External links
New York Times obituary
Princeton University obituary

1917 births
1993 deaths
Writers from Springfield, Massachusetts
American art historians
Princeton University alumni
Columbia University faculty
Deaths from Alzheimer's disease